Mykola Nyzhnyk (born 26 July 1995) is a Ukrainian long-distance runner. He qualified to represent Ukraine at the 2020 Summer Olympics in Tokyo 2021, competing in men's marathon.

In early March 2022, Nyzhnyk, who had been training near Iten, Kenya, returned to Ukraine to join its armed forces after the beginning of the Russian invasion of Ukraine.

References

 

1995 births
Living people
Ukrainian male long-distance runners
Athletes (track and field) at the 2020 Summer Olympics
Olympic athletes of Ukraine
Ukrainian male marathon runners
Olympic male marathon runners